This is a list of District governors of Alanya, Turkey.  Those marked (*) later became province governors, or Vali.

References
Alanya Kaymakamlığı

Alanya
Alanya